Kozmice is a municipality and village in Benešov District in the Central Bohemian Region of the Czech Republic. It has about 400 inhabitants.

Administrative parts
Villages of Kácova Lhota and Rousínov are administrative parts of Kozmice.

References

Villages in Benešov District